Noragyugh is a historic neighborhood in Kentron District of Yerevan, Armenia. A plan is in place to destroy the historic district and turn it into a business center, known as "New Yerevan".

References

External links

Populated places in Yerevan